The Bala Hissar uprising was an insurrection that took place on August 5, 1979, at the historical fortress Bala Hissar in the southern edge of Kabul, Afghanistan. Insurgents, as well as rebellious Afghan Army officers infiltrated and occupied the fortress. They were met by ruthless air bombardment by the Khalq government's MiG aircraft and artillery tank attacks.

The uprising was commanded by Faiz Ahmad of the Marxist (but anti-Khalq) Revolutionary Group of the Peoples of Afghanistan (RGPA) and engineered by the Afghanistan Mujahedin Freedom Fighters Front (AMFF), a united front of anti-government Maoist and moderate Islamist groups. It was planned to be the first in a string of insurrections at major army garrisons and bases, the objective being to deal a military and political blow to the ruling PDPA/Khalq government and pave the way for a military coup.

After the five hour battle, tens of Maoist cadres were killed and arrested, and the government swiftly took back control. Some RGPA central committee members like Mohammad Mohsin, Mohammad Dawod and others were executed in the Pul-e-Charkhi prison. Government loudspeaker trucks drove around Kabul announcing that the military action was retaliation of another international imperialist plot against the "people's regime".

Except from the Herat uprising, the Bala Hissar rebellion was the most significant of the many uprisings that took place throughout Afghanistan in 1979 before the start of the Soviet-Afghan War.

See also
Chindawol uprising
3 Hoot uprising
1979 Herat uprising

References

Military history of Afghanistan
1979 in Afghanistan
Conflicts in 1979
Cold War rebellions
August 1979 events in Asia
Rebellions in Afghanistan
Maoism in Afghanistan